Bedrampalla is a small town in Enmakaje Panchayat, Kerala, India.

Etymology

The name Bedrampalla is derived from Palla means river or pond located in Bedrampalla.

Transportation
Local roads have access to National Highway No.66 which connects to Mangalore in the north and Calicut in the south.  The nearest railway station is Manjeshwar on Mangalore-Palakkad line. There is an airport at Mangalore.

Languages
This locality is an essentially multi-lingual region. The people speak Malayalam, Kannada, Tulu, Beary bashe and Konkani. Migrant workers also speak Hindi and Tamil languages. This village is part of Manjeswaram assembly constituency which is again part of Kasaragod (Lok Sabha constituency)

References

Manjeshwar area